This is a list of the 108 members of the first Northern Ireland Assembly, the unicameral devolved legislature of Northern Ireland established by the Good Friday Agreement. Members (fully Members of the Legislative Assembly, MLAs) elected in June 1998 are listed, as well as those subsequently co-opted to replace those who had resigned or deceased. MLAs are grouped by party, and changes in party affiliation are noted.

Party strengths

Graphical representation

MLAs by party
This is a list of MLAs elected to the Northern Ireland Assembly in the 1998 Northern Ireland Assembly election, sorted by party.

† Co-opted to replace an elected MLA

‡ Changed affiliation during the term

MLAs by constituency
The list is given in alphabetical order by constituency.

† Co-opted to replace an elected MLA
‡ Changed affiliation during the term

Changes since the election

† Co-options

‡ Changes in affiliation

References

See also
Members of the Northern Ireland Assembly
Members of the Northern Ireland Forum
Northern Ireland MPs

 
Lists of members of the Northern Ireland Assembly